Windlestraw Law  is a hill in the Moorfoot Hills range, part of the Southern Uplands of Scotland. It is the highest peak of the range, and lies north of the town of Innerleithen in the Scottish Borders. A large and boggy peak, it is usually climbed from either its western slopes or the longer route from Tweeddale to the south.

Subsidiary SMC Summits

References

Marilyns of Scotland
Grahams
Donald mountains
Mountains and hills of the Scottish Borders
Mountains and hills of the Southern Uplands